"Daddy's Little Girl" is the second single lifted from Frankie J's third English-language album, Priceless. The version of the song used in the video is a slightly different edit than the album version.  This song is one of the few singles by Frankie J to fail to chart.  Its subject is about how many fathers in this world will not always be there for their daughters; sometimes they leave and never return.

Music video
The music video for this song features three different scenarios of father-daughter relationships. The video was shot black and white in order to reinforce the subject of the song. 
In the first scenario, a father argues with his daughter's mother, which doesn't go so well. Despite the pleas of the frightened girl, nothing worked out, but the father gave one last sign of his dedication to the saddened daughter.
In the second scenario, an old father is dying by the seconds of heart failure. His daughter, a grown woman, is sitting by his bed weeping in vain. Although the father is losing strength by the minute, he and his daughter embrace for the last time, and the father uses the last of his strength to show his outlived dedication to the woman.
In the last scenario, the father is going away to Iraq. His daughter embraces him a final time, then gives a military salute as she sees him off.
Scenes cut from the final video include Frankie J playing the piano and singing in front of a wall entangled with vines.

CD SINGLE
 Daddy's Little Girl (Radio Edit)
 Daddy's Little Girl (Album Version)
 If You Break Featuring Nicholas Strunk

References

External links
 "Daddy's Little Girl" Music Video

2006 singles
Frankie J songs
Songs written by Claude Kelly
Songs written by Happy Perez
2006 songs
Columbia Records singles